.cu is the country code top-level domain (ccTLD) for Cuba.

Registering .cu domain websites

Cuban and foreign legal entities, as well as natural persons residing in the country, may request the granting of a domain name.

Second-level domain names
  (commercial)

Non-foreign entities only 
  (educational institutions)
  (non-governmental organizations and nonprofit organizations) 
  (public network providers/operators)
  (government)
  (scientific information and providers of information or content)
  (natural persons residing in Cuba)

Delegated to external organisations
 
  (health)
  (tourism sector)
  (culture)

See also 

 List of Internet top-level domains
 Internet in Cuba
 ISO 3166-2:CU

References

External links
 Portal Cuba.cu
 IANA .cu whois information

Telecommunications in Cuba
Country code top-level domains
Internet in Cuba

sv:Toppdomän#C